St Margaret's Bay Windmill is a Grade II listed Smock mill on South Foreland, the southeasternmost point of England. It was built in 1929 to generate electricity for the attached house, high on the White Cliffs of Dover.

History
The mill was built for Sir William Bearswell by Holman's, the Canterbury millwrights. It was built to generate electricity and started generating in June 1929. The mill ceased to generate electricity in 1939, when the dynamo was removed. During the Second World War, the mill was occupied by a special branch of the WRNS. Repairs were done to the mill in 1969 by millwrights Vincent Pargeter and Philip Lennard. These included a new fantail and repairs to the sails.

Description

St Margaret's Bay Windmill is a three-storey smock mill on a single-storey brick base. It has four patent sails and is winded by a fantail. The mill generated electricity via a dynamo and is now used as residential accommodation, a use it has always had.

See also
South Foreland lighthouse is a few hundred metres away

References

External links
Windmill World page on the mill

Windmills in Kent
Smock mills in England
Grade II listed buildings in Kent
Electrical generators
Windmills completed in 1929
Octagonal buildings in the United Kingdom